Brawner is a surname. Notable people with the surname include:

Djay Brawner (born 1981), American music video, film and television director
Felix Brawner Jr., commander in Armed Forces of the Philippines
Romeo A. Brawner (1935–2008), Filipino public official

See also
Brawn (surname)